Falkenstein is a town in the district of Mistelbach in the Austrian state of Lower Austria.

It is home to Castle Falkenstein, a relatively intact castle ruin built in the 11th century. The ruin's German name is Burg Falkenstein ("Castle Falcon Stone").

Population

References

Cities and towns in Mistelbach District